Ekeby is a locality situated in Bjuv Municipality, Skåne County, Sweden with 3,230 inhabitants in 2010.

References 

Populated places in Skåne County
Populated places in Bjuv Municipality